The 2004–05 Moldovan Cup was the 14th season of the Moldovan annual football cup competition. The competition ended with the final held on 21 May 2005.

Round of 16
The first legs were played on 29 September 2004. The second legs were played on 20 October 2004.

|}

Quarter-finals
The first legs were played on 27 October 2004. The second legs were played on 10 November 2004.

|}

Semi-finals
The first legs were played on 13 April 2005. The second legs were played on 28 April 2005.

|}

Final

References
 
 

Moldovan Cup seasons
Moldovan Cup
Moldova